Sengapaduthankadu is a street in Thamarankottai village, which is an agricultural village in Cauvery Delta area. It comes under Pattukkottai taluk and Thanjavur district in Tamil Nadu, India. Pattukkottai and Adirampattinam are the nearby major towns. It is surrounded by many villages Thuvarankurichi, Mannangadu, Parakakalakottai, Thambikottai, Palanjur, Narasingapuram and Soundarannayakipuram.

Segapaduthankadu in Thamarankottai is the birthplace of the great poet Pattukkottai Kalyanasundaram Vellalar. The place is near to the sea. Thamarankottai reserved forest is located near to this street.

Manora (a big tower used by olden kings to guard the entry against enemies) is nearby this place 

The main occupation in this village is agriculture – rice, groundnuts, coconut, and sesame are cultivated. Above all, peoples are good hearted, helpful, polite, sportsmanship and educated.  Thamarankottai means Lotus eye men's Fort ( Rama ) an avatar of Lord Vishnu. When he goes to  Sri Lanka to Save Sita, Lord Rama walked through this villages.

Villages in Thanjavur district